Alisha Ena Wainwright (born July 14, 1989) is an American actress. She is best known for her leading roles on the Freeform series Shadowhunters (2017–2019) and the Netflix series Raising Dion (2019–2022).

Early life
Alisha Wainwright was born and raised in Orlando, Florida. Her mother is from Jamaica and her father is from Haiti.

Career
After appearing in a web comedy sketch on the YouTube channel Smosh in 2012, Wainwright guest-starred in several film and television productions including Criminal Minds and Lethal Weapon. In September 2016, her casting as the werewolf Maia Roberts on Freeform's fantasy series Shadowhunters, based on The Mortal Instruments book series by Cassandra Clare was announced. After being a recurring character in season 2, she was promoted to series regular for season 3 of the show. Wainwright currently stars in the Netflix series Raising Dion.

Filmography

Film

Television

Other

References

External links
 
 

1989 births
21st-century American actresses
Actresses from Orlando, Florida
Actresses from Florida
African-American actresses
Actresses of Haitian descent
American people of Haitian descent
American actors of Jamaican descent
American film actresses
American television actresses
American voice actresses
Living people
21st-century African-American women
21st-century African-American people
20th-century African-American people
20th-century African-American women